State Route 157 (SR 157), also known as Kyle Canyon Road, is a U.S. state highway in Clark County, Nevada. The highway connects the Las Vegas area to the recreational areas of Mount Charleston in the Spring Mountains.

Located in the Humboldt-Toiyabe National Forest, a portion of SR 157 has been designated a Nevada Scenic Byway. The route was originally State Route 39 and has origins dating back to the 1930s.

Route description

The highway begins at a dead end near Mount Charleston before descending downwards to the village of Mount Charleston. SR 157 then heads east, rapidly losing elevation. Part of the route is designated as a Nevada Scenic Byway. SR 157 then meets U.S. Route 95 (US 95) at a diverging diamond interchange before ending at Sky Pointe Drive in northwest Las Vegas.

History

Kyle Canyon Road has existed since at least 1933, having been established as a county road connecting Charleston Peak (in what was then Dixie National Forest) to State Route 5 (now US 95) at Tule to the east. By 1935, the entire  of the highway had been paved and designated as State Route 39 by the state.

SR 39 appears to have remained unchanged for several years after being included in the state highway system. Its first major change occurred on July 1, 1976, when the route was renumbered to State Route 157 in the mass renumbering of Nevada's state highways. This change was first reflected on official state maps in 1978.

In July 1998, the Nevada Department of Transportation designated SR 157 as a Nevada Scenic Byway. The scenic route encompasses the westernmost  of the highway within the national forest area.

On June 20, 2019, NDOT celebrated the completion of the diverging diamond interchange at the SR 157 junction with US 95, which later opened on June 24, 2019. The interchange was a component of a $78 million project which improved a  stretch of US 95 in northwest Las Vegas between Ann Road and SR 157, and replaced what was previously an at-grade intersection.

Major intersections

See also

References

157
Spring Mountains
157
Transportation in Clark County, Nevada